Bijoy Malakar is an Indian politician,who was elected to the Assam Legislative Assembly from Ratabari in the 2019 by election as a member of the Bharatiya Janata Party due to Kripanath Mallah elected to Parliament.

References

Living people
Bharatiya Janata Party politicians from Assam
People from Karimganj district
Assam MLAs 2016–2021
Year of birth missing (living people)
Assam MLAs 2021–2026